Test of Practical Competency in ICT (TOPCIT) is a performance-evaluation-centered test designed to diagnose and assess the competency of Information Technology specialists and Software Developers that is critically needed to perform jobs on the professional frontier.

TOPCIT was developed and is administered by Korea's Ministry of Science, ICT and Future Planning (MSIP) and the Institute for Information and Communications Technology Promotion. They are government agencies that overlook and manage ICT related R&D, policy, and HR development.

Background 
Companies and higher education institutions voiced the need for a standardized and objective competency index that can reinforce the on-site competency of ICT/SW college students and narrow the gap between the viewpoints of industrial and academic circles regarding the qualifications of a competent specialist in the field.

Objective
To improve the quality of ICT/SW education at universities, resolve the manpower shortage experienced by ICT companies, and expand the growth potential of ICT/SW industries and education system:

TOPCIT has been developed to objectively assess the competency of those planning on entering the ICT field. The analyzed data will assist universities and industries in admitting students or hiring new recruits respectively.
TOPCIT measures the competency by evaluating the test-takers’ answers to a series of creative problem solving questions and by assessing their executive ability.

Participating Companies and Universities
A total of 269 people from 231 companies and educational academies participated and founded the TOPCIT (August 2013). Through mutual development of companies and academies, TOPCIT was made with an objective of closing the gap between the industry and academic circles regarding the practical qualifications of a competent specialist in this field. Through the systematic network between companies and schools, the gap between the demand of skilled workers that companies want and the skilled workers that the educational academies graduate will also be closed.

Contents
TOPCIT has a total of 65 questions with up to 1,000 points. There are 4 types of questions in the test: multiple-choice, short-answer, descriptive-writing, and critical-thinking questions. There is a technical field and business field in the TOPCIT.

Technical Field
The Technical Field tests the Ability of software development, Database Construction and Operation, and the Understanding and Utilization of Network and Security.

Software: The software module tests the test takers' Understanding of Software, Ability to Analyze & Design Software, Develop & Test Software, Manage Software, and Implement Integrated Technology.
Database: The Database module tests the knowledge of concepts and structure of database, ability to design, program, and operate database, and the understanding of database applications.
Network and Security: The Network and Security module tests the examinees’ knowledge of Network Concepts, Network Infrastructure Technology, Network Application Technology, IT Security, Ability run IT Security, and the knowledge of the latest IT Security Technology and Standards

Business Field
The Business Field tests the ability of Understanding IT Business, Technical Communication Skills, and Project Management.

IT Business: The IT Business Module consists of Understanding IT Business and Utilizing IT Business
Technical Communications: The Technical Communication Module consists of Understanding Business Communications and Utilizing Technical Documentation.
Project Management: The Project Management Module consists of Understanding of Project, Project Management, and Project Tools and Evaluation.

Test scores
There are five TOPCIT Competency Levels and they are categorized as shown in the table below.

Notes and references

External links
 Test of Practical Competency in ICT
 Test of Practical Competency in ICT 
 Institute for Information and Communications Technology Promotion 

Information technology qualifications